Air Manas is a low-cost airline headquartered in Bishkek, Kyrgyzstan with its base at Manas International Airport.

History 

Air Manas was founded in 2006 in Bishkek. The first flight of Air Manas was carried out in December 2009. In June 2012, 49% of the air company was bought by a Turkish Pegasus Airlines. The first flight under the brand name Pegasus Asia was operated from Bishkek to Istanbul on 22 March 2013. Now the airline operates domestic flights between Bishkek to Osh, as well as international flights from Kyrgyzstan to India, Russia, Turkey and China.

The efforts of the Kyrgyz Government to attract foreign investments had borne fruit: mutual visits of high-level governmental delegations gave a serious impetus to bilateral trade relations between Turkey and Kyrgyzstan. Thus, at the end of 2012 in the basis of pre-existing airline, a new Kyrgyz airline with the same name of "Air Manas" was created, being 51% owned by the Kyrgyz side and 49% by newly attracted strategic partner Pegasus Airlines, one of the leading air companies in Europe.

Air Manas has its own certified aviation-technical base for the operational maintenance of aircraft. Despite the lack of any incidents, the airline along with all airlines based in Kyrgyzstan are on the list of air carriers banned in the European Union.

As of October 2022, the airline is unable to use its currently sole aircraft, an Airbus A220-300, due to sanctions against its Russian lessor.

Destinations
As of December 2022, Air Manas serves the following destinations:

Kyrgyzstan
Bishkek — Manas International Airport base
Osh — Osh Airport

Fleet

Current fleet
As of December 2022, the Air Manas fleet consists of the following aircraft:

Former fleet
The airline also previously operated the following aircraft types:
 Boeing 737-400
 Boeing 737-400
 Boeing 737-800

References

External links

Official website

Airlines of Kyrgyzstan
Airlines banned in the European Union
Airlines established in 2006
Low-cost carriers
2006 establishments in Kyrgyzstan